Thorildsplan metro station is a station on the Green line of the Stockholm metro. It takes its name from the nearby park of Thorildsplan, which in turn is named after the writer Thomas Thorild, and is in the district of Kristineberg, which is in the borough of Kungsholmen in central Stockholm. The station has a single island platform and is located in the centre of Drottningholmsvägen, with access from a pedestrian underpass at its eastern end that passes under both road and rail line.

The station was inaugurated on 26 October 1952 as a part of the section of line between Hötorget and Vällingby.

As part of Art in the Stockholm metro project, the station has two distinct art works. A relief of a sun on the track wall is by Huck Hultgren and dates from 1975. A painting of concrete surfaces on the theme of Thomas Thorild, genius, inventor, thinker is by Tobias Apelgren and Lou Åberg and dates from 1998.

Gallery

References

Green line (Stockholm metro) stations
Railway stations opened in 1952